Little Heavy Burdens  is the second studio album by Belgian indie rock band Intergalactic Lovers.

Track listing

Charts

Weekly charts

Year-end charts

References

2014 albums
Intergalactic Lovers albums